André Schiffrin (June 14, 1935 – December 1, 2013)  was a French-American author, publisher and socialist.

Life 
Schiffrin was born in Paris, the son of Jacques Schiffrin, a Russian Jew who emigrated to France and briefly enjoyed success there as publisher of the Bibliothèque de la Pléiade, which he founded, and which was bought by Gallimard, until he was dismissed because of the anti-Jewish laws enforced by the Vichy regime. Jacques Schiffrin and his family had to flee and eventually found refuge in the United States. As the younger Schiffrin recalls in his autobiography, A Political Education: Coming of Age in Paris and New York (2007), he thus experienced life in two countries as a child of a European Jewish intellectual family. He attended Yale University, where he won the Alpheus Henry Snow Prize, and Clare College, Cambridge, where he studied English on a Mellon Fellowship for two years and edited the student literary magazine Granta.

As an anti-Communist socialist, Schiffrin opposed both the Soviet invasion of Czechoslovakia and the U.S. war in Vietnam. He was one of the founders of the organization that became Students for a Democratic Society. In 1968, he signed the "Writers and Editors War Tax Protest" pledge, vowing to refuse tax payments in protest against the Vietnam War.

Schiffrin was the managing director of publishing at Pantheon Books, where he was partially responsible for introducing the works of Pasternak, Foucault and others to American readers. Schiffrin's 28-year period at Pantheon, a division of Random House, came to an end in 1990 when CEO Alberto Vitale sacked him because of a conflict over the division's losses and the downsizing which Vitale wished to make.

In 1992 Schiffrin, with former Pantheon colleague Diane Wachtell, established the non-profit The New Press, explaining that he did so because of economic trends that prevented him from publishing the serious books he thought should be made available. Schiffrin discussed what he regards as the crisis in western publishing in his book The Business of Books: How the International Conglomerates Took Over Publishing and Changed the Way We Read (2000).

In 2011, Schiffrin was made a Chevalier of the Légion d'honneur by the French government.

Schiffrin's daughter, journalist Anya Schiffrin, is married to the economist and Nobel Prize winner Joseph Stiglitz. His daughter Natalia is married to international lawyer Philippe Sands.

Schiffrin died on December 1, 2013 in Paris from pancreatic cancer.

Works 
 L'édition sans éditeurs (1999) 
 The Business of Books: How the International Conglomerates Took Over Publishing and Changed the Way We Read (2000)  (Hardback )
Published in German as Verlage ohne Verleger. Über die Zukunft der Bücher. Mit einem Nachwort von Klaus Wagenbach, translated by Gerd Burger; Verlag Klaus Wagenbach, Berlin 2000 
 Le contrôle de la parole (2005) 
 A Political Education: Coming of Age in Paris and New York (Melville House Publishing, 2007) 
Published in French as Allers-retours : Paris-New York, un itinéraire politique (2007) 
Published in German as Paris, New York und zurück. Politische Lehrjahre eines Verlegers, translated by Andrea Marenzeller; Matthes & Seitz, Berlin 2010 
 L'argent et les mots (2010) 
 Words and Money (Verso Books, 2010) 

Although there exist no English versions of L'édition sans éditeurs or Le contrôle de la parole, there is some overlap of content between The Business of Books and the former.

See also
List of English-language book publishing companies

References

External links

André Schiffrin papers, 1944-2014, Rare Book and Manuscript Library, Columbia University, New York, NY

1935 births
2013 deaths
Alumni of Clare College, Cambridge
American book publishers (people)
American tax resisters
American writers in French
20th-century American writers
21st-century American writers
Chevaliers of the Légion d'honneur
Deaths from cancer in France
Deaths from pancreatic cancer
French emigrants to the United States
20th-century French Jews
French people of Russian-Jewish descent
Writers from Paris